Samil is a civil parish in the municipality of Bragança, Portugal. The population in 2011 was 1,246, in an area of 10.25 km².

References

Parishes of Bragança, Portugal